Goričica pri Moravčah is a settlement in the Municipality of Moravče in central Slovenia. The area is part of the traditional region of Upper Carniola region. It is now included with the rest of the municipality in the Central Slovenia Statistical Region.

Name
The name of the settlement was changed from Goričica to Goričica pri Moravčah in 1955.

References

External links

Goričica pri Moravčah on Geopedia

Populated places in the Municipality of Moravče